Kathleen Cody may refer to:

 Kathleen Cody (actress) (born 1954), American actress
 Kathleen Cody (camogie), Irish former camogie player